The Alan B. Miller Hall became the home of the Mason School of Business at the College of William & Mary in Williamsburg, Virginia, United States in 2009. The building was designed by prominent firm Robert A.M. Stern Architects. The building has been awarded LEED Gold Certification after adhering to sustainability standards. It also houses the Mason School of Business Library.

Constructed in a little over two years at a project cost of $75 million, Alan B. Miller Hall is named after alumnus Alan B. Miller '58, a healthcare management entrepreneur who founded Fortune 500 company Universal Health Services.

References

External links
Mason School of Business
Miller Hall facts

School buildings completed in 2009
College of William & Mary buildings
Robert A. M. Stern buildings
2009 establishments in Virginia